The Blackfoot I.O.O.F. Hall, at 57 Bridge St. in Blackfoot, Idaho, was built in 1905.

Its rear wall shows rough lava-rock structural fabric, while the front, brick facade is refined and survives about storefronts on the ground level.

Entrance to the second floor Odd Fellows meeting hall is by stairway from the rear.

References

Blackfoot 		
National Register of Historic Places in Bingham County, Idaho
Buildings and structures completed in 1905
1905 establishments in Idaho